Jurij Rodionov (born 16 May 1999) is an Austrian tennis player of Belarusian descent.
He has a career high ATP singles ranking of World No. 120 achieved on 28 November 2022. He also has a career high doubles ranking of World No. 268 achieved on 15 July 2019.

Professional career

2018-2020: Major debut, Three Challenger titles, top 150, top-20 win 

Rodionov won three ATP Challenger singles titles.  The first came at the 2018 Almaty Challenger. His second title came when he won the 2020 RBC Tennis Championships of Dallas. His third title came at the 2020 Morelos Open. In 2019, he won his maiden ATP Challenger doubles title at the Shymkent Challenger.

Rodionov made his main draw Grand Slam debut at the 2020 French Open as qualifier and reached the second round with a win over Jérémy Chardy in 5 sets.

He reached the top 150 on 12 October 2020 at World No. 148. Also in October 2020, as a wildcard, he had the biggest win of his career in Vienna, where he beat 8th seed and World no. 12 Denis Shapovalov in straight sets. He lost in the second round to Dan Evans.

2021: Maiden ATP semifinal
Rodionov reached as a wildcard his maiden quarterfinal after retirement of Peter Gojowczyk and semifinal after defeating Alex De Minaur at the 2021 MercedesCup in Stuttgart before retiring due to injury in the match with eventual champion Marin Čilić. As a result of this run, he reached a career-high ranking of World No. 135 on 14 June 2021.

2022: Two more Challenger titles, Austrian No. 1
He won two more Challenger titles in March and May 2022. As a result became Austrian No. 1 on 9 May 2022 and reached a career-high ranking of World No. 124 on 23 May 2022.

Davis Cup
Rodionov represents Austria at the Davis Cup, where he has a W/L record of 0–3. He made his debut at the 2019 Davis Cup Qualifying Round against Nicolás Jarry of Chile.

Singles performance timeline 

Current through the 2022 Davis Cup.

ATP Challenger and ITF Futures finals

Singles: 6 (5 titles, 1 runner-up)

Doubles: 1 (1 title)

Junior Grand Slam finals

Doubles: 1 (1 runner-up)

References

External links
 
 
 

1999 births
Living people
Sportspeople from Nuremberg
Austrian male tennis players
Austrian people of Belarusian descent
People from Gänserndorf District
Sportspeople from Lower Austria
21st-century Austrian people